Mabitac, officially the Municipality of Mabitac,  is a 5th class municipality in the province of Laguna, Philippines. According to the 2020 census, it has a population of 21,275 people.

Mabitac was an excellent hunting ground for wild game three centuries ago. Native hunters used numerous cave-ins or trap-ins called "bitag" in the local dialect. Hence, the place was referred to as "Mabitag" meaning "a place with many traps".

Mabitac is situated on the eastern side of the province of Laguna,  from Manila using Rizal Province on a winding road of Manila East Road, and Antipolo City or  via the South Luzon Express, Calamba and Santa Cruz, Laguna.

History
The first Spaniards who came to this place were the friars who established the first Spanish settlement in the area and began to Christianize the local population. The Spaniards, having difficulty in pronouncing the "G" consonant, called this place "Mabitac" whenever they mentioned this place. Eventually, the name found its way in the official records and maps of Laguna made by Spanish cartographers and mariners who chartered the coastal areas of Laguna de Bay.

This town was formerly a barrio of Siniloan, an immediate neighboring town. It became an independent municipality only in the year 1611, not by legislation, but by mutual agreement by and between the Spanish friars of both towns who were then the influential ruling class.

Mabitac was the site of a battle in the Philippine–American War, when on September 17, 1900, Filipinos under General Juan Cailles defeated an American force commanded by Colonel Benjamin F. Cheatham.

World War II and Japanese occupation

The Japanese occupation of the Philippines occurred between 1942 and 1945, when Imperial Japan occupied the Commonwealth of the Philippines during World War II. The invasion of the Philippines started on 8 December 1941, ten hours after the attack on Pearl Harbor. 

In 1942, Japanese soldiers entered and occupied Mabitac. In 1945, the Philippine Commonwealth Army troops of the 4th, 42nd and 43rd Infantry Division and 4th Constabulary Regiment of the Philippine Constabulary together with the recognized guerrillas defeated the Japanese Imperial forces during the Second Battle of Mabitac.

Geography

Barangays
Mabitac is politically subdivided into 15 barangays:

Climate

Demographics

Economy

Gallery

Notable personalities
Juan Cailles (born Juan Cailles y Kauppama; November 10, 1871 – June 28, 1951) was a Filipino of French-Indian descent. A member of the revolutionary movement Katipunan, he was a commanding officer of the Philippine Revolutionary Army who served during the Philippine Revolution and Philippine–American War. He later served as a provincial Governor of Laguna and a member of the Philippine Legislature.

See also
Battle of Mabitac

References

External links

"Municipality of Mabitac", Province of Laguna Website
[ Philippine Standard Geographic Code]
Philippine Census Information
Local Governance Performance Management System

Municipalities of Laguna (province)
Populated places on Laguna de Bay